Ezra Eugene Gossage (February 17, 1935 – May 1, 2011) was an American and Canadian football player who played for the Hamilton Tiger-Cats and Philadelphia Eagles. He won the Grey Cup with the Tiger-Cats in 1963. He played college football at Northwestern University and was drafted in the 1958 NFL draft by the Philadelphia Eagles (Round 28, #328 overall). He died in 2011 at the age of 76.

References

1935 births
Hamilton Tiger-Cats players
2011 deaths
People from Columbia, Tennessee
Northwestern Wildcats football players
Players of American football from Tennessee
Philadelphia Eagles players
People from Old Saybrook, Connecticut